Kelkar is a surname native to the Indian state of Maharashtra. It is found mainly among Chitpavan Brahmin community.

Notable people
Notable people with the surname include:

Ashok Ramchandra Kelkar (born 1929), linguist and critical Marathi writer from Maharashtra, India
Bhalchandra Vaman Kelkar (1920–1987), Marathi writer and stage actor, from Maharashtra, India
Dinkar G. Kelkar (1896–1990), Indian writer, art collector and historian
Diwakar Krushna Kelkar (1902–1973), Marathi writer from Maharashtra, India
Girijabai Kelkar (1886–1980), feminist and writer from India
 Keerti Gaekwad Kelkar (born 21 January 1974), Indian actor
Narasimha Chintaman Kelkar (1872–1947), British era Indian Nationalist leader, lawyer, journalist, dramatist, writer, critic and historian
P. K. Kelkar, Indian scientist, founding director of the Indian Institute of Technology Kanpur
Ratnakar Hari Kelkar (1901–1985), revisor and translator of the Bible into Marathi
Sharad Kelkar (born 7 October 1972), Indian television and film actor
Vijay Kelkar (born 1942), Indian economist and academic, chairman of the Forum of Federations, Ottawa

See also
P K Kelkar library or Indian Institute of Technology Kanpur, established by an Act of Parliament in 1959
Vinayak Ganesh Vaze College of Arts, Science & Commerce (Kelkar College), Mumbai, a Mumbai University affiliated college
Raja Dinkar Kelkar Museum, in Pune, Maharashtra, India
Kela (disambiguation)
Kelar
Kelk (disambiguation)

References